Sean Jonathan Pryce Parry (born 1 June 1987) is a Hong Kong cricketer. Parry is a right-handed batsman who bowls right-arm medium pace. He was born in Kowloon, Hong Kong.

While studying for his degree at Durham University, Parry made a single first-class appearance for Durham UCCE against Lancashire in 2006. He scored 36 runs in the university's first-innings, before being dismissed by Gary Keedy, while in their second-innings he was dismissed for 30 runs by Simon Marshall.

References

External links
Sean Parry at ESPNcricinfo
Sean Parry at CricketArchive

1987 births
Living people
People from Kowloon
Hong Kong cricketers
Durham MCCU cricketers
Alumni of St Mary's College, Durham